SEFI may refer to
 or European Society for Engineering Education

People with the name
Michael Sefi (born 1943), British philatelist 
Sefi Atta (born 1964), Nigerian author and playwright
Sefi Rivlin (1947-2013), Israeli actor and comedian
A. J. Sefi (1889-1934), British philatelist
Sefi Vigiser, one of the founder of Mirabilis